is a former Japanese football player.

Playing career
Date was born in Shizuoka on 22 August 1966. After graduating from University of Tsukuba, he joined his local club Yamaha Motors (later Júbilo Iwata) in 1989. From his first season with the club, he played many matches as a centre-back. The club played in Japan Soccer League until 1992. In 1992, Japan Soccer League was folded and the club joined Japan Football League. In 1992, the club won the league. In 1993, the club finished in second place and was promoted to J1 League from 1994. In 1995, he moved to newly was promoted to J1 League club, Kashiwa Reysol. He retired end of 1997 season.

Club statistics

References

External links

1966 births
Living people
University of Tsukuba alumni
Association football people from Shizuoka Prefecture
Japanese footballers
Japan Soccer League players
J1 League players
Japan Football League (1992–1998) players
Júbilo Iwata players
Kashiwa Reysol players
Association football defenders